Numerai is an AI-run, crowd-sourced hedge fund based in San Francisco. It was created by South African technologist Richard Craib in October 2015. Its primary competitors are other open source trading platforms mainly CrunchDAO, QuantConnect, and WorldQuant.

Numerai’s trades are determined by an AI, which is fueled by a network of thousands of anonymous data scientists.

Numerai's investment group was led by Howard Morgan of Renaissance Technologies, and its investors include Paul Tudor Jones and Naval Ravikant.

Numerai hosts a weekly tournament, in which data scientists submit their predictions in exchange for the potential to earn rewards paid in a cryptocurrency called Numeraire. Numerai raised $7.5 million in 2016 from First Round Capital and Union Square Ventures in two funding rounds.

The company was the world’s first AI hedge fund to create its own cryptocurrency. Numerai's Ethereum-based cryptocurrency, named after the company itself, is called Numeraire. The current supply of Numeraire is 6 million.

References 

Hedge funds